USS SC-499 was a SC-497 class submarine chaser that served in the United States Navy and later the United States Coast Guard during World War II.  She was laid down as SC-499 on 24 February 1941 by the Fisher Boat Works in Detroit, Michigan, and launched on 24 October 1941.  She was commissioned as USS SC-499 on 18 March 1942.  She was later transferred to the Coast Guard on 20 August 1945.  Her exact fate is unknown.

See also 
 Other ships built by Fisher Boat Works:
 MV Cape Pine
 HNoMS Hitra
 USS SC-500

References
Motor Gunboat/Patrol Gunboat Photo Archive: SC-499

SC-497-class submarine chasers
Ships built in Detroit
1941 ships
Ships of the United States Coast Guard
Ships transferred from the United States Navy to the United States Coast Guard